Randall Okita is a Canadian film director, screenwriter and visual artist known for creating work that involves rich visual language and innovative approaches to storytelling.

Career 
His 2014 National Film Board of Canada short film The Weatherman and the Shadowboxer has been described as “a visually stunning tour de force.” It won the award for Best Canadian Short Film at the 2014 Toronto International Film Festival, and was named to the festival's year-end Canada's Top Ten list of the year's ten best Canadian shorts. It also won awards for Best Short Film at the Festival du nouveau cinéma in Montreal, Best Experimental Short Film at both the New York Short Film Festival and LA Shorts Fest, as well as Best Cinematography at the Berlin International Short Film Festival.

Once Right Now Just Then, Okita's 2015 performance which explored presence, the passing of time and the nature of grieving and expectation was presented as part of Sunday Drive Art Projects.

Okita's 2016 feature directorial debut The Lockpicker, which “explores the complexity of adolescence” and “sustains an evocative and ominous mood that complements its moments of operatic intensity,” received the Discovery Award at the Canadian Screen Awards. The film won the Grand Jury Award at the San Diego Asian Film Festival 2016, Best First Feature at 2016 the Reel Asian Film Festival, and Best Narrative Feature at the 2016 West Virginia International Film Festival.

In 2016 Be Here Now, an interactive multimedia installation made from feathers, wood, wire, and interactive sound and light, described as “a mirage that feels highly spiritual", was part of "a breathtaking exhibition" of artworks at the Robert Kananaj Gallery, and a part of a group exhibition at the Art Gallery of Ontario Massive Party.

The Book of Distance, “a lyrical, personal and moving story told with stylized figures in a 360° landscape,” is a room-scale virtual reality experience, written and directed by Okita. It was an official selection at the  2020 Sundance Film Festival, 2020 Tribeca Film Festival, 2020 Venice International Film Festival and 2020 Hot Docs Canadian International Documentary Festival. It won 2020 Festival du Nouveau Cinema’s FNC Explore Prix Horizon, 2020 Vancouver International Film Festival’s Best in Animation - Virtual/Mixed Reality, 2020 Kaohsiung Film Festival’s VR Golden Fireball Award and 2020 Japan Prize’s Best Work in Digital Media Division.
His film See for Me premiered at the 2021 Tribeca Film Festival.

In 2021, Randall directed the IFC film See For Me, which screened at the Tribeca Film Festival and the BFI London Festival.

References

External links

Canadian male screenwriters
Canadian people of Japanese descent
Canadian writers of Asian descent
Canadian Screen Award winners
Living people
Canadian Film Centre alumni
Asian-Canadian filmmakers
Year of birth missing (living people)